This is a list of notable New York City Police Department (NYPD) officers.

Early years: 1845–1865

Post-Civil War era: 1866–1899

Early 20th century: 1898–1945

Post-World War II: 1946–1977

Modern: 1978–present

References
Notes

Further reading

Costello, Augustine E. Our Police Protectors: History of the New York Police from the Earliest Period to the Present Time. New York: A.E. Costello, 1885.
Hickey, John J. Our Police Guardians: History of the Police Department of the City of New York, and the Policing of Same for the Past One Hundred Years. New York: John J. Hickey, 1925.

External links 
 NYPD website

 A history of the NYPD

 
Officers
Lists of police officers
New York City-related lists